Cibrian is a surname. Notable people with the surname include:

 Eddie Cibrian (born 1973), American actor
 José Cibrián (1916–2002), Argentinean actor
 Kiko Cibrian (born 1959), Mexican-American guitarist and composer